Samuel Lightfoot Flournoy may refer to:
 Samuel Lightfoot Flournoy (West Virginia lawyer) (1886–1961), American lawyer and politician
 Samuel Lightfoot Flournoy (West Virginia senator) (1846–1904), American lawyer and politician

See also
 Flournoy (surname)
 Lightfoot (surname)